The Place may refer to:
 The Place (London), a dance and performance centre in London, England
 The Place (film), a 2017 Italian film
 The Place (album), a 2003 music album

See also 
 Place (disambiguation)